In geometry, Euler's rotation theorem states that, in three-dimensional space, any displacement of a rigid body such that a point on the rigid body remains fixed, is equivalent to a single rotation about some axis that runs through the  fixed point. It also means that the composition of two rotations is also a rotation. Therefore the set of rotations has a group structure, known as a rotation group.

The theorem is named after Leonhard Euler, who proved it in 1775 by means of spherical geometry. The axis of rotation is known as an Euler axis, typically represented by a unit vector . Its product by the rotation angle is known as an axis-angle vector. The extension of the theorem to kinematics yields the concept of instant axis of rotation, a line of fixed points.

In linear algebra terms, the theorem states that, in 3D space, any two Cartesian coordinate systems with a common origin are related by a rotation about some fixed axis. This also means that the product of two rotation matrices is again a rotation matrix and that for a non-identity rotation matrix one eigenvalue is 1 and the other two are both complex, or both equal to −1. The eigenvector corresponding to this eigenvalue is the axis of rotation connecting the two systems.

Euler's theorem (1776)

Euler states the theorem as follows:

Theorema.
Quomodocunque sphaera circa centrum suum conuertatur, semper assignari potest diameter,
cuius directio in situ translato conueniat cum situ initiali.

or (in English):
When a sphere is moved around its centre it is always possible to find a diameter whose direction in the displaced position is the same as in the initial position.

Proof

Euler's original proof was made using spherical geometry and therefore whenever he speaks about triangles they must be understood as spherical triangles.

Previous analysis
To arrive at a proof, Euler analyses what the situation would look like if the theorem were true. To that end, suppose the yellow line in Figure 1 goes through the center of the sphere and is the axis of rotation we are looking for, and point  is one of the two intersection points of that axis with the sphere. Then he considers an arbitrary great circle that does not contain  (the blue circle), and its image after rotation (the red circle), which is another great circle not containing . He labels a point on their intersection as point . (If the circles coincide, then  can be taken as any point on either; otherwise  is one of the two points of intersection.) 

Now  is on the initial circle (the blue circle), so its image will be on the transported circle (red). He labels that image as point . These arcs have the same length because arc  is mapped onto arc . Also, since  is a fixed point, triangle  is mapped onto triangle , so these triangles are isosceles, and arc  bisects angle .

Construction of the best candidate point
Let us construct a point that could be invariant using the previous considerations. We start with the blue great circle and its image under the transformation, which is the red great circle as in the Figure 1. Let point  be a point of intersection of those circles. If ’s image under the transformation is the same point then  is a fixed point of the transformation, and since the center is also a fixed point, the diameter of the sphere containing  is the axis of rotation and the theorem is proved.

These arcs have the same length. (That is, the yellow region in Figure 3.)

Proof of its invariance under the transformation
In other words,  is a fixed point of the transformation, and since the center is also a fixed point, the diameter of the sphere containing  is the axis of rotation.

Final notes about the construction

He also proposed the intersection of two planes:

the symmetry plane of the angle  (which passes through the center  of the sphere), and
the symmetry plane of the arc  (which also passes through ).

Proposition. These two planes intersect in a diameter. This diameter is the one we are looking for.

Proof. Let us call  either of the endpoints (there are two) of this diameter over the sphere surface. Therefore the point  has to remain fixed under the movement.

Corollaries. This also shows that the rotation of the sphere can be seen as two consecutive reflections about the two planes described above. Points in a mirror plane are invariant under reflection, and hence the points on their intersection (a line: the axis of rotation) are invariant under both the reflections, and hence under the rotation.

The rotation axis is obviously orthogonal to this plane, and passes through the center  of the sphere.

Given that for a rigid body any movement that leaves an axis invariant is a rotation, this also proves that any arbitrary composition of rotations is equivalent to a single rotation around a new axis.

Matrix proof

A rotation matrix has the fundamental property that its inverse is its transpose, that is

where  is the  identity matrix and superscript T indicates the transposed matrix. 

Compute the determinant of this relation to find that a rotation matrix has determinant ±1. In particular,

A rotation matrix with determinant +1 is a proper rotation, and one with a negative determinant −1 is an improper rotation, that is a reflection combined with a proper rotation.

It will now be shown that a proper rotation matrix  has at least one invariant vector , i.e., . Because this requires that , we see that the vector  must be an eigenvector of the matrix  with eigenvalue . Thus, this is equivalent to showing that .

Use the two relations

for any  matrix A and

(since ) to compute

This shows that  is a root (solution) of the characteristic equation, that is,

In other words, the matrix  is singular and has a non-zero kernel, that is, there is at least one non-zero vector, say , for which

The line  for real  is invariant under , i.e.,  is a rotation axis. This proves Euler's theorem.

Equivalence of an orthogonal matrix to a rotation matrix
Two matrices (representing linear maps) are said to be equivalent if there is a change of basis that makes one equal to the other. A proper orthogonal matrix is always equivalent (in this sense) to either the following matrix or to its vertical reflection:

Then, any orthogonal matrix is either a rotation or an improper rotation. A general orthogonal matrix has only one real eigenvalue, either +1 or −1. When it is +1 the matrix is a rotation. When −1, the matrix is an improper rotation.

Excursion into matrix theory
In order to prove the previous equation some facts from matrix theory must be recalled.

An  matrix  has  orthogonal eigenvectors if and only if  is normal, that is, if . This result is equivalent to stating that normal matrices can be brought to diagonal form by a unitary similarity transformation:

The eigenvalues  are roots of the characteristic equation. If the matrix  happens to be unitary (and note that unitary matrices are normal), then

and it follows that the eigenvalues of a unitary matrix are on the unit circle in the complex plane:

Also an orthogonal (real unitary) matrix has eigenvalues on the unit circle in the complex plane. There are 3 roots, thus at least one of them must be purely real (+1 or −1).

After recollection of these general facts from matrix theory, we return to the rotation matrix . It follows from its realness and orthogonality that we can find a  such that:

If a matrix  can be found that gives the above form, and there is only one purely real component and it is −1, then we define  to be an improper rotation. Let us only consider the case, then, of matrices R that are proper rotations (the third eigenvalue is just 1). The third column of the  matrix  will then be equal to the invariant vector .

If  has eigenvalue 1, then  and  has also eigenvalue 1, which implies that in that case . In general, however, as
Finally, the matrix equation is transformed by means of a unitary matrix,

which gives

We can now see how our definition of improper rotation corresponds with the geometric interpretation: an improper rotation is a rotation around an axis (here, the axis corresponding to the third coordinate) and a reflection on a plane perpendicular to that axis. If we only restrict ourselves to matrices with determinant 1, we can thus see that they must be proper rotations. This result implies that any orthogonal matrix  corresponding to a proper rotation is equivalent to a rotation over an angle  around an axis .

Equivalence classes
Since a trace is invariant under an orthogonal matrix similarity transformation,

This matrix transformation is clearly an equivalence relation, that is, all such equivalent matrices form an equivalence class. 

In fact, all proper rotation  rotation matrices form a group, usually denoted by SO(3) (the special orthogonal group in 3 dimensions) and all matrices with the same trace form an equivalence class in this group. All elements of such an equivalence class share their rotation angle, but all rotations are around different axes.

Applications

Generators of rotations

Suppose we specify an axis of rotation by a unit vector , and suppose we have an infinitely small rotation of angle  about that vector. Expanding the rotation matrix as an infinite addition, and taking the first order approach, the rotation matrix  is represented as:

 

A finite rotation through angle  about this axis may be seen as a succession of small rotations about the same axis. Approximating  as  where  is a large number, a rotation of  about the axis may be represented as:

It can be seen that Euler's theorem essentially states that all rotations may be represented in this form. The product  is the "generator" of the particular rotation, being the vector  associated with the matrix . This shows that the rotation matrix and the axis–angle format are related by the exponential function.

One can derive a simple expression for the generator . In this plane one can choose an arbitrary vector  with perpendicular .

This modified rotation matrix can be rewritten as an exponential function.

Analysis is often easier in terms of these generators, rather than the full rotation matrix. Analysis in terms of the generators is known as the Lie algebra of the rotation group.

Quaternions

It follows from Euler's theorem that the relative orientation of any pair of coordinate systems may be specified by a set of three independent numbers. Sometimes a redundant fourth number is added to simplify operations with quaternion algebra. Three of these numbers are the direction cosines that orient the eigenvector. The fourth is the angle about the eigenvector that separates the two sets of coordinates. Such a set of four numbers is called a quaternion.

While the quaternion as described above, does not involve complex numbers, if quaternions are used to describe two successive rotations, they must be combined using the non-commutative quaternion algebra derived by William Rowan Hamilton through the use of imaginary numbers.

Rotation calculation via quaternions has come to replace the use of direction cosines in aerospace applications through their reduction of the required calculations, and their ability to minimize round-off errors. Also, in computer graphics the ability to perform spherical interpolation between quaternions with relative ease is of value.

Generalizations

A rigid motion in three dimensions that does not necessarily fix a point is a "screw motion". This is because a composition of a rotation with a translation perpendicular to the axis is a rotation about a parallel axis, while composition with a translation parallel to the axis yields a screw motion; see screw axis. This gives rise to screw theory.

See also
 Euler angles
 Euler–Rodrigues parameters
 Rotation formalisms in three dimensions
 Angular velocity
 Rotation around a fixed axis
 Matrix exponential
 Axis–angle representation
Chasles' theorem (kinematics), for an extension concerning general rigid body displacements.

Notes

References

 Euler's theorem and its proof are contained in paragraphs 24–26 of the appendix (Additamentum. pp. 201–203) of L. Eulero (Leonhard Euler), Formulae generales pro translatione quacunque corporum rigidorum (General formulas for the translation of arbitrary rigid bodies), presented to the St. Petersburg Academy on October 9, 1775, and first published in Novi Commentarii academiae scientiarum Petropolitanae 20, 1776, pp. 189–207 (E478) and was reprinted in Theoria motus corporum rigidorum, ed. nova, 1790, pp. 449–460 (E478a) and later in his collected works Opera Omnia, Series 2, Volume 9, pp. 84–98.

External links
Euler's original treatise in The Euler Archive: entry on E478, first publication 1776 (pdf)
Euler's original text (in Latin) and English translation (by Johan Sten)
 Wolfram Demonstrations Project for Euler's Rotation Theorem (by Tom Verhoeff)

Euclidean symmetries
Theorems in geometry
Rotation in three dimensions
Leonhard Euler